The 2011 World Table Tennis Championships mixed doubles was the 51st edition of the mixed doubles championship.  

Li Ping and Cao Zhen were the defending champions. Li did not compete this year and Cao instead teamed up with Zhang Chao.

Zhang Chao and Cao Zhen won in the final against Hao Shuai and Mu Zi 11–7, 11–7, 11–9, 9–11, 11–8. Thus Cao retained her title from 2009 with her second consecutive gold medal in the Mixed Doubles event.

Seeds
Matches will be best of 5 games in qualification matches and best of 7 games in the 128-player sized main draw.

  Hao Shuai /  Mu Zi (final)
  Zhang Chao /  Cao Zhen (world champions)
  Cheung Yuk /  Jiang Huajun (semifinals)
  Seiya Kishikawa /  Ai Fukuhara (semifinals)
  Tang Peng /  Tie Ya Na (third round)
  Kenta Matsudaira /  Kasumi Ishikawa (fourth round)
  Yang Zi /  Wang Yuegu (quarterfinals)
  Yan An /  Feng Yalan (fourth round)
  Gao Ning /  Li Jiawei (fourth round)
  Chuang Chih-yuan /  Cheng I-ching (fourth round)
  Kim Min-Seok /  Yang Ha-Eun (third round)
  Lee Jung-Woo /  Lee Eun-Hee (fourth round)
  Seo Hyun-Deok /  Seok Ha-Jung (quarterfinals)
  Bora Vang /  Sirin He (third round)
  Evgueni Chtchetinine /  Viktoria Pavlovich (quarterfinals)
  Andrei Filimon /  Elizabeta Samara (third round)
  Lubomir Pistej /  Eva Ódorová (second round)
  Vitaly Nekhvedovich /  Veronika Pavlovich (third round)
  Žolt Pete /  Gabriela Feher (second round)
  Carlos Machado /  Shen Yanfei (third round)
  Adrian Crişan /  Daniela Dodean (third round)
  Jiang Tianyi /  Lee Ho Ching (fourth round)
  Huang Sheng-sheng /  Huang Yi-hua (fourth round)
  Igor Rubtsov /  Anna Tikhomirova (second round)
  Janos Jakab /  Georgina Póta (third round)
  Petr Korbel /  Renata Strbikova (second round)
  Fedor Kuzmin /  Oxana Fadeeva (third round)
  Kenji Matsudaira /  Misako Wakamiya (third round)
  Kim Hyok-Bong /  Kim Jong (quarterfinals)
  Zoltan Fejer-Konnerth /  Zhenqi Barthel (third round)
  Tomas Konecny /  Iveta Vacenovska (second round)
  Lin Ju /  Wu Xue (third round)
  Emmanuel Lebesson /  Carole Grundisch (third round)
  Wang Zeng Yi /  Natalia Partyka (third round)
  Andrej Gacina /  Cornelia Molnar (first round, withdrew)
  Stefan Fegerl /  Li Qiangbing (second round)
  Alexander Shibaev /  Anastasia Voronova (second round)
  Mattias Karlsson /  Matilda Ekholm (second round)
  Sharath Kamal /  Shamini Kumaresan (second round)
  Thomas Keinath /  Barbora Balazova (second round)
  Daniel Kosiba /  Petra Lovas (first round)
  Ri Chol-Guk /  Kim Hye-Song (second round)
  Marko Jevtović /  Anamaria Erdelji (second round)
  Alfredo Carneros /  Sara Ramirez (second round)
  Jakub Kosowski /  Katarzyna Grzybowska (third round)
  Jesus Cantero /  Galia Dvorak (second round)
  Ruwen Filus /  Kathrin Muhlbach (second round)
  Jiang Pengfei /  Melek Hu (second round)
  Pavel Sirucek /  Dana Hadačová (second round)
  Paul Drinkhall /  Joanna Parker (second round)
  Pang Xue Jie /  Yu Mengyu (fourth round)
  Chen Chien-an /  Liu Hsing-yin (second round)
  William Henzell /  Lay Jian Fang (second round)
  Ovidiu Ionescu /  Bernadette Szocs (third round)
  Tomislav Kolarek /  Tian Yuan (second round)
  Quentin Robinot /  Aurore Dessaint (second round)
  Pavel Platonov /  Alexandra Privalova (second round)
  Darius Knight /  Kelly Sibley (second round)
  Ivan Katkov /  Ganna Gaponova (second round)
  Gustavo Tsuboi /  Jessica Yamada (first round)
  Omar Assar /  Dina Meshref (second round)
  Cazuo Matsumoto /  Ligia Silva (second round)
  Amalraj Anthony /  Madhurika Patkar (first round)
  Muhd Shakirin Ibrahim /  Beh Lee Wei (second round)

Draw

Finals

Top half

Section 1

Section 2

Section 3

Section 4

Bottom half

Section 5

Section 6

Section 7

Section 8

References

External links
Main Draw

-